Joseph Osborn (August 28, 1937 – December 14, 2018) was an American bass guitar player known for his work as a session musician in Los Angeles with the Wrecking Crew and in Nashville with the A-Team of studio musicians during the 1960s through the 1980s.

Biography

Early career
Osborn began his career working in local clubs, then played on a hit record by singer Dale Hawkins.  He moved to Las Vegas at age 20, and spent a year playing backup for country singer Bob Luman. With legendary guitar player Roy Buchanan among his bandmates, Osborn switched from guitar to electric bass. In 1960, with Allen "Puddler" Harris, a native of Franklin Parish, also in northeastern Louisiana, and James Burton, originally from Webster Parish, Osborn joined pop star Ricky Nelson's backup band, where he spent four years. His playing on such Nelson hits as "Travelin' Man" began attracting wider notice, and he found opportunities to branch out into studio work with artists such as Johnny Rivers.

Studio bassist in Los Angeles
When the Nelson band dissolved in 1964, Osborn turned to studio work in Los Angeles full-time. For the next ten years, he was considered a "first-call" bassist among Los Angeles studio musicians (known as The Wrecking Crew), and he worked with well-known producers such as Lou Adler and Bones Howe, frequently in combination with drummer Hal Blaine and keyboardist Larry Knechtel—the combination of Blaine, Osborn and Knechtel have been referred to as the Hollywood Golden Trio. His bass can be heard on many of the hit records cut in Los Angeles during that time, along with numerous film scores and television commercials.

His playing can be heard on records by such well-known groups as the Mamas & the Papas, the Association, the Grass Roots and the 5th Dimension. Osborn can be heard on Simon & Garfunkel's "Bridge over Troubled Water" and the 5th Dimension's version of "Aquarius/Let the Sunshine In". A song featuring prominently mixed bass in melodic counterpoint to acoustic guitars is the 1972 hit single "Ventura Highway" by the group America. Osborn played on many of Neil Diamond's major hits in the late 1960s and early to middle 1970s, including the hauntingly unique bass lines on "Holly Holy" in 1969. He can be heard playing on several of Nancy Sinatra's 1970s recordings, and he was the bassist on the 1977 Christian album Forgiven by Don Francisco. He also played on several Johnny Rivers records.

Osborn is known for his discovery and encouragement of the popular brother-and-sister duo the Carpenters, on whose albums he played bass throughout their career.

Work in Nashville
In 1974, Osborn left Los Angeles and moved to the country and western capital, Nashville. He continued an active studio career, playing behind such vocalists as Kenny Rogers, Mel Tillis, and Hank Williams, Jr. One count listed Osborn as bassist on fifty-three number one hits on the country charts and at least 197 that were in the top 40's.  Osborn's musical gift has been credited to over 242 different songs, with many performances going uncredited in his early years.  Osborn left Nashville in 1988 and settled in Keithville in Caddo Parish near Shreveport in northwestern Louisiana.

Later life
From 2005 until December 2018, he continued to live in semi-retirement and record occasionally.  He enjoyed continuing to create new charts and recordings with Richard Carpenter, as well as playing bass at his local church.  Joe continued to inspire and work in the studio locally through May 2017, with his most recent credit being given on the album by Micah and the Jazzgrass Apocalypse which was released in August 2018.

Osborn was diagnosed with pancreatic cancer in early 2018 and died on December 14, 2018 at his home.

Equipment and style
Osborn's instrument throughout most of his recording career was a 1960 Fender stack-knob Jazz Bass, which was given to him by Fender just prior to touring Australia with Nelson. Osborn said he was initially disappointed that Fender had not sent him a Precision Bass, which he had been using, but he said he grew to like the Jazz Bass because the narrower neck made it easier for his short fingers. He strung the bass with LaBella flatwound bass strings that he did not change for 20 years and his style was distinctive, with a resonant, bright tone produced, in part, by his use of a plectrum (pick).  This very bass is on permanent display at Musicians Hall of Fame and Museum in Nashville, TN.

Many producers and arrangers chose to spotlight his contributions by mixing the bass line more prominently than had been customary, and incorporating brief bass solos into their arrangements.

He had a signature bass, the "Joe Osborn Signature", made by American guitar manufacturer Lakland, although it is now called the "44-60 Vintage J Bass". In 2012, Fender Guitar built a custom Fender Jazz Bass for Osborn according to his desired specifications. He recorded with this bass for the first time when producing and playing bass on teen musician Matthew Davidson's debut recording.

Awards and honors
Joe Osborn was nominated for Bass Player of the Year by the Academy of Country Music in 1980, 1981, 1982, 1983, 1984, and 1985, winning the honor four out of six times.

His awards also include:

 1980  Bass Player of the Year, Nominee, Academy of Country Music
 1981  Bass Player of the Year, Winner, Academy of Country Music
 1982  Bass Player of the Year, Nominee, Academy of Country Music
 1983  Bass Player of the Year, Winner, Academy of Country Music
 1984  Bass Player of the Year, Winner, Academy of Country Music
 1985  Bass Player of the Year, Winner, Academy of Country Music
 2010  The Louisiana Music Hall of Fame.

Osborn had two sons in the music business, Darren and Dave Osborn. Darren is the managing partner of Sandbox Recording Studios on Robinson Place in the Highland section of Shreveport.

Selected discography
 Travelin' Man (Ricky Nelson)
 Memphis (Johnny Rivers)
 California Dreamin' (The Mamas & the Papas)
 Windy (The Association)
 MacArthur Park (Richard Harris)
 Aquarius/Let the Sunshine In (The 5th Dimension)
 The Only Living Boy in New York (Simon & Garfunkel)
 For All We Know (The Carpenters)
 Forgiven, Don Francisco, 1977
 It's Going to Take Some Time (The Carpenters)
 Bridge over Troubled Water (Simon & Garfunkel)
 Midnight Confessions (The Grass Roots)
 Ventura Highway (America)

Collaborations 
 In Action - Johnny Rivers (1964)
 Sounds of Silence - Simon & Garfunkel (1966)
 Rewind - Johnny Rivers (1967)
 Gentle on My Mind - Glen Campbell (1967)
 By the Time I Get to Phoenix - Glen Campbell (1967)
 Realization - Johnny Rivers (1968)
 Wichita Lineman - Glen Campbell (1968)
 A New Place in the Sun - Glen Campbell (1968)
 Bookends - Simon & Garfunkel (1968)
 Hey Little One - Glen Campbell (1968)
 Sunshower - Thelma Houston (1969)
 Galveston - Glen Campbell (1969)
 Is This What You Want? - Jackie Lomax (1969)
 Bridge over Troubled Water - Simon & Garfunkel (1970)
 Slim Slo Rider - Johnny Rivers (1970)
 Try a Little Kindness - Glen Campbell (1970)
 Easy Does It - Al Kooper (1970)
 Cold Spring Harbor - Billy Joel (1971)
 Home Grown - Johnny Rivers (1971)
 Nevada Fighter - Michael Nesmith (1971)
 Barbra Joan Streisand - Barbra Streisand (1971)
 Paul Simon - Paul Simon (1972)
 David Clayton-Thomas - David Clayton-Thomas (1972)
 L.A. Reggae - Johnny Rivers (1972)
 Angel Clare - Art Garfunkel (1973)
 Lulu - Lulu (1973)
 Reunion: The Songs of Jimmy Webb - Glen Campbell (1974)
 Houston (I'm Comin' to See You) - Glen Campbell (1974)
 New Lovers and Old Friends - Johnny Rivers (1975)
 Breakaway - Art Garfunkel (1975)
 Wild Night - Johnny Rivers (1976)
 Troubadour - J. J. Cale (1976)
 Don't Stop Believin' - Olivia Newton-John (1976)
 Kenny Rogers - Kenny Rogers (1976)
 Amy Grant - Amy Grant (1977)
 Watermark - Art Garfunkel (1977)
 Daytime Friends - Kenny Rogers (1977)
 Comes a Time - Neil Young (1978)
 Kenny - Kenny Rogers (1979)
 Dreamlovers - Tanya Tucker (1980)
 Scissors Cut - Art Garfunkel (1981)
 Great Hits of the Past - Chet Atkins (1983)
 Old Ways - Neil Young (1985)
 The Animals' Christmas - Amy Grant, Art Garfunkel (1985)
 Time - Richard Carpenter (1987)
 Lefty - Art Garfunkel (1988)
 Pianist, Arranger, Composer, Conductor - Richard Carpenter (1998)

References

External links
 
 
 Joe Osborn interview on A&M Corner
 

1937 births
2018 deaths
People from Madison Parish, Louisiana
American rock bass guitarists
American session musicians
Guitarists from Louisiana
The Wrecking Crew (music) members
American country bass guitarists
Musicians from Nashville, Tennessee
People from Keithville, Louisiana
Guitarists from Los Angeles
Guitarists from Tennessee
American male bass guitarists
20th-century American bass guitarists
Deaths from pancreatic cancer
Deaths from cancer in Louisiana
Country musicians from California
Country musicians from Tennessee
Country musicians from Louisiana
20th-century American male musicians